Charlie Harbour (20 June 1924 – 24 August 1988) was an  Australian rules footballer who played with St Kilda in the Victorian Football League (VFL).

Notes

External links 

1924 births
1988 deaths
Australian rules footballers from Victoria (Australia)
St Kilda Football Club players